Fox Lake is a lake in Martin County, Minnesota, in the United States.

Fox Lake is the English translation of the Native American name.

Location 
Fox Lake covers 165 acres. Is is located approximately 10.2 miles north of Bemidji, Minnesota.

See also
List of lakes in Minnesota

References

Lakes of Minnesota
Lakes of Martin County, Minnesota